is a former Japanese football player. She played for Japan national team.

Club career
Torigoe played for Speranza FC Takatsuki.

National team career
In November 1999, Torigoe was selected Japan national team for 1999 AFC Championship. At this competition, on November 8, she debuted against Thailand. She played 8 games for Japan until 2001.

National team statistics

References

1976 births
Living people
Japanese women's footballers
Japan women's international footballers
Nadeshiko League players
Speranza Osaka-Takatsuki players
Women's association football defenders